Ženski košarkaški klub Vojvodina (Women's Basketball Club Vojvodina) is a former women's basketball team from Novi Sad, Serbia. He was part of the multi-sports club Vojvodina.

History
ŽKK Vojvodina was founded 1948 in Novi Sad, Serbia. He was part of the multi-sports club Vojvodina. In the course of its history ŽKK Vojvodina has twice been state champion and cup winner.

On April 17, 2015, Ana Dabović became club president despite the fact that at the time she was active basketball player. In October 2016, she left the position of club president.

In December 2016, the club was expelled from the league, which effectively ended the club's existence.

Arena

Sports Center Vojvodina is a multi-purpose indoor arena located in Novi Sad. It operates under publicly owned company JP "Sportski i poslovni centar Vojvodina", which in addition to SPENS also has "Sajmište Sports Center" under its umbrella. There are two halls one has a capacity of 11,500 seats, and second halls of 1,030 seats. Sprawled over 85,000 m2, SPENS consists of main hall, 'small' hall, ice-hockey rink (which can house 1,623), bowling alley, shooting range, 3 training halls, swimming pool, 11 tennis courts, media center, 2 press centers, amphitheater, reception salon, conference hall, double-level garage, and 215 retail and business spaces that house banks, furniture stores, tourist agencies, jewelers, bookstores, pool halls, fitness clubs, boutiques, etc. Its construction was completed in less than 2 years, and on 14 April 1981, SPENS opened its door for the first time, its inaugural event being the 9th Table Tennis European Championships in Novi Sad (hence the unofficial name of the venue).

SPENS' most famous residents are basketball's KK Vojvodina Srbijagas (participating in Basketball League of Serbia) and volleyball's OK Vojvodina. Spens is hosted basketball's European Cup Winners' Cup Final 
1987, group D (group stage) of Eurobasket 2005, Group C (group stage) and the Group II of the main round, which consisted of the 2012 European Men's Handball Championship and played Serbia men's national volleyball team in FIVB World League, as well as its friendly warm-up games.

Supporters

The Firma (Serbian Cyrillic: Фирма) are supporters of the Novi Sad football club Vojvodina. Although the club had numerous supporters throughout the history, more organized groups emerged end of the 1970s and beginning of the 1980s. In 1989, for the first time starts the idea of uniting of all the smaller supporter groups. This idea is realized and the group was named Red Firm. A few days later, several youngsters established the group Firma (English: The Firm) as one of the subgroups, because they wanted a Serbian name for their group.

The disintegration of Yugoslavia and its follows led to stagnation in all Yugoslavian supporter groups so that in 1992, the Red Firm fell apart and the Firma took over the leadership of the organized supports. The members of Firma call themselves Firmaši (English:Members of the Firma), the plural of the singular form Firmaš, and belongs today to the top supporter groups in Serbia. They are more known as ultras, not hooligans.

Besides football, they also support other sport sections of the Vojvodina Novi Sad Sport Association. The club also has a group of their oldest supporters, called the Stara Garda (English: Old Guard) and who are for more than 40 years in the east stand of the stadium. The Firma are in a brotherhood with the organized fan group of Borac Banja Luka from Bosnia and Herzegovina, the Lešinari.

Honours

Domestic
National Championships – 2

First League of SFR Yugoslavia:
Winners (2) : 1969, 1970
Runners-up (2) : 1972, 1992
First League of FR Yugoslavia / Serbia and Montenegro:
Runners-up (3) : 2004, 2005, 2006
First League of Serbia:
Runners-up (1) : 2015

National Cups – 2

Cup of SFR Yugoslavia:
Runners-up (2) : 1972
Cup of FR Yugoslavia / Serbia and Montenegro:
Winners (1) : 2001
Runners-up (2) : 1995, 1998, 1999, 2005, 2006
Milan Ciga Vasojević Cup:
Winners (1) : 2015
Runners-up (1) : 2007

International
International titles – 0
Adriatic League:
Runners-up (1) : 2006

Notable former players

Marija Veger
Gordana Grubin
Ljubica Drljača
Marija Erić
Suzana Milovanović
Slobodanka Tuvić
Jasmina Perazić
Ana Joković
Milica Beljanski
Nataša Ivančević
Neda Đurić
Dragana Vuković
Stojanka Došić
Snežana Momirov
Ivana Matović
Ana Perović
Snežana Jovanović
Tatjana Mitrić
Andrea Pinter
Nataša Bučevac
Aleksandra Vujović
Biljana Pavićević
Jovana Popović
Irena Matović
Jelena Milovanović
Milica Dabović
Sara Krnjić
Jasmina Perazić
Jasmina Ilić
Jovana Pašić
Jelena Vučetić

Coaching history

  Stevan Putnik (1948)
  Vojislav Panić (1958–1960)
  Ladislav Demšar (1964–1972)
  Milutin Minja (1973–1974)
  Stevan Mezei (1974–1975)
  Ladislav Demšar (1980–1984)
  László Rátgéber (1984–1993)
  Dragan Vuković
  Milovan Stepandić (2003–2004)
  Dragomir Bukvić (2004–2005)
  Zoran Višić (2006)
  Radojica Nikitović (2006–2008)
  Zoran Mirković (2010–2011)
  Dušan Kasum (2011–2012)
  Miodrag Selimović (2012–2013)
  Aleksandar Jovanović (2013–2014)
  Milan Dabović (2014–2016)

See also
 List of basketball clubs in Serbia by major honours won

References

External links
 Profile on eurobasket.com
 Profile on srbijasport.net

ŽKK Vojvodina
Women's basketball teams in Serbia
Sport in Novi Sad
Women's basketball teams in Yugoslavia
Basketball teams established in 1948
1948 establishments in Serbia
Defunct basketball teams in Serbia